Poz or POZ may refer to:

 Paul Posluszny, American football linebacker
 POZ (magazine), magazine and website that covers HIV and AIDS
 Poznań–Ławica Airport, Poland (IATA airport code POZ)
 Malayo-Polynesian languages (ISO 639-5 code "poz")